Events from the year 1749 in Denmark.

Incumbents
 Monarch — Frederick V
 Prime minister — Johan Ludvig Holstein-Ledreborg

Events
 January 3 — The newspaper Berlingske is first published by Ernst Henrich Berling, making it the oldest Danish newspaper still in printing.

Births
 January 29 — Christian VII, king of Denmark (died 1808)
 June 9 — Andreas Kirkerup, architect (d. 1810)
 August 11 — Christian August Lorentzen, painter (died 1828)
 November 29 — Johan Frederik Clemens, engraver (died 1831)

References

 
Years of the 18th century in Denmark
Denmark
Denmark
1740s in Denmark